The Department of Veterans Affairs Act of 1988 changed the former Veterans Administration, an independent government agency established in 1930, primarily at that time to see to needs of World War I, into a Cabinet-level Department of Veterans Affairs.  It was signed into law by President Ronald Reagan on October 25, 1988, but actually came into effect under the term of his successor, George H. W. Bush, on March 15, 1989.

This bill passed into law over the objection of some of President Reagan's fellow Republicans, who were committed to preventing the U.S. federal government from expanding further.  Many Republicans along with most Democrats ultimately supported it on the basis that it was really more of a reorganization than an expansion of government as the new department was in reality going to be doing very few things that the former Veterans Administration had not already been doing. There was the further consideration that military veterans constitute a large and powerful voting bloc and could easily be offended at the perceived slight that opposition to the bill might have implied.

References
Bill Information from Congress.gov service
Green Book from the U.S. House Committee Ways and Means

1988 in law
1988 in the United States
History of veterans' affairs in the United States
United States Department of Veterans Affairs
United States federal veterans' affairs legislation